Conant's Cabin and Park, also known as the Rural Wayside Rest and Recreation Site, is a private park located east of Gladbrook, Iowa, United States. The American Craftsman-style cabin was inspired by his father, J.W. Conant, who wanted to see a cabin like he constructed in 1855 built in the grove of bur oak trees. The two-room log structure is possibly the oldest park shelter in Iowa. In addition to the cabin the park features two outhouses, outdoor and indoor picnic tables, grills, a swing, merry-go-round and horseshoe pit. The park was meant for public use even though it has remained under private ownership throughout its existence. It is rumored that author Robert Waller began his notes for The Bridges of Madison County during a stop at the park. The park's existence is an expression of one man's civic pride, and sense of community responsibility. Numerous community service groups have helped to maintain it over the years. It was listed on the National Register of Historic Places in 2000.

References

Buildings and structures completed in 1920
American Craftsman architecture in Iowa
Buildings and structures in Tama County, Iowa
Protected areas of Tama County, Iowa
National Register of Historic Places in Tama County, Iowa
Parks on the National Register of Historic Places in Iowa
Log buildings and structures on the National Register of Historic Places in Iowa